Richland Township is one of twelve townships in Rush County, Indiana. As of the 2010 census, its population was 337 and it contained 138 housing units.

Richland Township most likely was so named on account of their fertile soil.

Geography

Unincorporated towns
 Richland at 
(This list is based on USGS data and may include former settlements.)

References

External links
 Indiana Township Association
 United Township Association of Indiana

Townships in Rush County, Indiana
Townships in Indiana